The 2022 Frisco Bowl was a college football bowl game played on December 17, 2022, at Toyota Stadium in Frisco, Texas. The fifth annual Frisco Bowl, it featured Boise State of the Mountain West Conference and North Texas of Conference USA (C-USA). The game began at 8:25 p.m. CST and was aired on ESPN. It was one of the 2022–23 bowl games concluding the 2022 FBS football season.

Teams
Based on conference tie-ins, the game will feature teams from any of the Group of Five conferences.

This will be the seventh all-time meeting between Boise State and North Texas; the all-time series is currently tied at 3–3.  The Broncos and Mean Green were both members of the Big West Conference from 1996 until the conference ended its football sponsorship following the 2000 season.

North Texas Mean Green

The Mean Green, from Conference USA (C-USA), finished the regular season with a record of 7–5 (6–2 in conference play). The team tied with Western Kentucky for second in the conference, with their victory over the Hilltoppers securing the tiebreaker to advance to the C-USA Championship Game, in which they lost to UTSA 48-27. The team will be coached by interim head coach Phil Bennett for this bowl game.

This will be North Texas' final game as a member of C-USA, as the Mean Green are set to join the American Athletic Conference in 2023.

Boise State Broncos
 Boise State represented the Mountain West Conference. This is the university's first appearance in the Frisco Bowl. The team is led by second year head coach Andy Avalos.

Boise State started 2-2 going into the fifth week into the season. They fired offensive coordinator Tim Plough on September 24, putting then senior analyst Dirk Koetter in the role. Starting quarterback Hank Bachmeier would transfer out of the program the next day, giving redshirt freshman Taylen Green the starting job. The team would finish the remainder of the season 7-1, before losing to Fresno State in the Mountain West Championship Game.

Game summary

Statistics

References

Frisco Bowl
Frisco Bowl
Frisco Bowl
Frisco Bowl
Boise State Broncos football bowl games
North Texas Mean Green football bowl games